Ahmed Boulane (born 1 January 1956 in Salé, Morocco) is a Moroccan film director, producer and screenplay writer. Known as l'enfant terrible du cinéma marocain for his antics with journalists and his fellow filmmakers, he is considered to be one of the most talented directors in Morocco.

Biography 

After a stint working in theater and radio as an actor in Morocco and then living in Italy, he returned to Morocco where he worked for 25 years in various positions in the film industry: actor, location manager, production manager, casting director and first assistant director. He was first assistant director in more than fifty international feature films for renowned directors, such as Giuliano Montaldo, Carlo Di Palma, Alan J. Pakula, Philippe de Broca, Jean Delannoy and John Landis, among others.

His first short film, Voyage dans le passé received the prestigious Vatican award at the 7th Milan African Film Festival and launched his dream of a becoming a feature film director.

His first feature film, Ali, Rabiaa and the Others was removed from movie theaters a few days after its release, considered too controversial for Morocco, but he won several international awards for this project.

Despite a chaotic production where permits were refused at the last minute by certain Moroccan administrations, his second feature film, The Satanic Angels, was first at the box office in Morocco in 2008, ahead of films like Harry Potter and 300.

His most recent films are The Return of the Son in 2011, and La Isla, a co-production with Spain released in 2016.

In 2019 Ahmed Boulane published his first book Ma vie est belle, translated into English by Dana Schondelmeyer (What a Beautiful Life), a memoir of his childhood, adolescence and early twenties. 

In 2019 he was nominated as the head of the grand jury for the Golden Movie Awards Africa.

Filmography
 1990: Plateau idéal (director)
 1990: Crime imparfait (director)
 1993: Adopte-moi (director)
 1996: Voyage dans le passé (director, producer, screenplay writer)
 2000: Ali, Rabiaa and the Others... (director, producer, screenplay writer)
 2001: Midnight Fly (co-producer)
 2002: Fetching Water and Go karts (director)
 2002: Casablanca, Casablanca (co-screenplay writer)
 2003: Moi, ma mère et Betina (director, screenplay writer)
 2007: The Satanic Angels (director, producer, screenplay writer)
 2011: The Return of the Son (director, producer, screenplay writer)
 2015: La Isla (director, producer, screenplay writer)

Actor
 1977: El Kanfoudi by Nabil Lahlou
 1979: Le Gouverneur général by Nabil Lahlou
 1981: Rollover by Alan J. Pakula
 1982: Al Jamra  by Farida Bourkia
 1983: Afghanistan pourquoi ? by Abdellah Mesbahi
 1985: Ishtar by Elaine May
 1987: Deadline by Richard Stroud
 1988: Der Aufsteiger by Peter Kevilc
 1989: Les 1001 nuits by Philippe de Broca
 1990: Un submarí a les estovalles by Ignasi P. Ferré
 1992: L'Enfant lion by Patrick Grandperret
 1993: Enfance volée by Hakim Noury
 1994: Marie de Nazareth by Jean Delannoy
 1994: King David by Robert Markowitz
 1996: Aouchtam by Mohamed Ismaïl
 1997: Di cielo in cielo by Roberto Giannarelli
 1997: Solomon by Roger Young
 1997: Marrakech Express by Gillies MacKinnon
 1998: The Seventh Scroll by Kevin Connor
 1999: Passeur d'enfants by Franck Apprederis
 2000: Ali, Rabiaa and the Others... by Ahmed Boulane
 2001: Le Piano by Lahcen Zinoun
 2002: Casablanca, Casablanca by Farida Belyazid
 2003: Jawhara by Saâd Chraïbi
 2004: Story of One by Nick Murphy
 2005: Suspect by Mohamed Caghat
 2006: The Satanic Angels by Ahmed Boulane
 2007: Al Kadia by Noureddine Lakhmari
 2007: Whatever Lola Wants by Nabil Ayouch
 2008: Cicatrice by Mehdi Salmi
 2011: The Return of the Son by Ahmed Boulane
 2013: Prisoners of the Sun by Roger Christian
 2015: La Isla by Ahmed Boulane
 2016: Julie - Aicha by Ahmed Maanouni
 2017: Razzia by Nabyl Ayouch
 2018: Instinto by Carlos Sedes
 2019: The Spy by Raf Gideon
 2020:   Los Favoritos of Mida by Mateo Gil
 2020:   Rauhantekijä  by Antti jussi Annilla
 2021: " Bab Labhar TV serie by Chawki laoufir opruduced by Ali In.
 2022: " Los frad " TV Serie by Mariano Barroso.

Awards

Voyage dans le passé
 1997: 2nd prize Vatican Award - 7th Milan African Film Festival, Milan, Italy 
 1998: Special Jury Mention - 5th National Moroccan Film Festival, Casablanca, Morocco

Ali, Rabiaa and the Others
 2000: Best First Film - 6th National Moroccan Film Festival, Marrakech, Morocco
 2000: Journalists' Award - 6th National Moroccan Film Festival, Marrakech, Morocco
 2000: Best Editing - 6th National Moroccan Film Festival, Marrakech, Morocco
 2001: Best Supporting Actor - 6th National Moroccan Film Festival, Marrakech, Morocco
 2001: Best Supporting Actor - Alexandria Film Festival, Alexandria, Egypt
 2002: Special Jury Mention - Avança International Film Festival, Avança, Portugal

The Satanic Angels
 2007: Best Music - 6th National Moroccan Film Festival, Tangier, Morocco
 2008: Jury's Award - Avança International Film Festival, Avança, Portugal

The Return of the Son
 2012: Best Director - International Film Festival of Cinema and Migration, Utrecht, Netherlands
 2012: Coup du Coeur - 12th Marrakech International Film Festival, Marrakech, Morocco

La Isla
 2015: Coup du Coeur - 15th Marrakech International Film Festival, Marrakech, Morocco
 2016: Jury's Award - Helsinki African Film Festival, Helsinki, Finland
 2017: Best Comedy - Cordoba International Film Festival, Cordoba, Columbia
 2017: Young Jury's Award - Angers African Film Festival, Angers, France

References

External links 

Site officiel d'Ahmed Boulane

1956 births
People from Salé
Moroccan film directors
Living people